Shyheim Devonte Tuttle (born October 20, 1995) is an American football defensive tackle for the Carolina Panthers of the National Football League (NFL). He played college football at Tennessee.

Early life and high school
Tuttle grew up in Midway, North Carolina and attended North Davidson High School where he was a member of the basketball, football, and track and field teams. He made 315 career tackles, 66 tackles for loss and 35 sacks as a four-year starter for the Black Knights and was named All-Northwest North Carolina in each of his final three seasons and was played in the 2015 Under Armour All-American Game.

College career
Tuttle played four seasons for the Tennessee Volunteers. His freshman season was cut short after only six games, recording ten tackles and a fumble recovery, after suffering a broken fibula and tearing a ligament in his ankle against Georgia. Tuttle's sophomore year also ended prematurely when he sustained a season-ending injury in his first career start against South Carolina. In his junior season, Tuttle played in ten games (four starts) and made 27 tackles (2.5 for loss). As a senior, he started all 12 of Tennessee's games and made 33 tackles (2.5 for loss) with one sack, an interception and two blocked kicks.

Professional career

New Orleans Saints
Tuttle signed with the New Orleans Saints as an undrafted free agent on April 27, 2019. He made his NFL debut September 9, 2019, starting the season opener against the Houston Texans and recorded a combined sack of Deshaun Watson. In Week 13 against the Atlanta Falcons on Thanksgiving Day, Tuttle garnered national attention after recording his first career interception off a pass thrown by Matt Ryan in the 26–18 victory and stiff arming Ryan onto the turf. Tuttle played in all 16 of the Saints' games during the regular season and made 18 tackles (three for loss) with two sacks, four passes defended and an interception and made three tackles, including one for loss, with two passes defended in the Saints loss against the Minnesota Vikings in the Wild Card Round of the playoffs.

Carolina Panthers
On March 15, 2023, Tuttle signed a three-year, $19.5 million contract with the Carolina Panthers.

Personal life
Tuttle is the nephew of former Clemson, NFL and CFL wide receiver Perry Tuttle.

References

External links

New Orleans Saints bio
Tennessee Volunteers bio

1995 births
American football defensive tackles
Living people
New Orleans Saints players
Players of American football from North Carolina
People from Davidson County, North Carolina
Tennessee Volunteers football players
Under Armour All-American football players